The Mindanao racket-tail (Prioniturus waterstradti) is a species of parrot in the family Psittaculidae. It is endemic to Mindanao in the Philippines. It was previously conspecific with the Luzon Racket-tail. Two subspecies are recognized: the nominate waterstradti in the south-east, and malindangensis in the west. Its natural habitat is

tropical moist montane forests. It is becoming rare due to habitat loss and trapping for the pet trade.

Description and Taxonomy 
EBird describes the bird as "A medium-sized parrot.The two central tail feathers have extended shafts ending in a racket shape. Green overall, darker on the back and paler below, with deeper green on the head and a blue face. Occurs together with Mindanao lorikeet, but is larger and lacks the red face and bill. Voice includes various nasal squeals and a harsh, metallic “ra-geek!” often in flight." Known to fly low over the forest.

Subspecies 
Two subspecies are recognized

Prioniturus waterstradti waterstradti in the south-east; browner mantle 

Prioniturus waterstradti malindangensis:  in the west; paler blue on crown and face

Habitat and Conservation Status 
It inhabits tropic moist montane forest at 820–2,700 m, but it has been recorded as low as 450 m. 

IUCN has assessed this bird as near threatened with its population being estimated as 3,300 mature individuals. Despite this fairly low number and limited range, it is said to be locally common in its range. Montane forest is less under threat than lowland forest. Forest loss may represent a threat but it is not thought to have a significant impact within this species's alititudinal range. Many parrots in the region are affected by trapping for trade, but its impacts upon this species are not known.

It is recommended to gather data on the impacts of international and national trade. Undergo surveys to have a better population estimate. Calculate rates of forest loss within its altitudinal and geographic range using satellite imagery and remote sensing techniques. Effectively protect habitat at key sites,

References

Prioniturus
Birds of Mindanao
Parrots of Asia
Near threatened animals
Near threatened biota of Asia
Birds described in 1904
Taxonomy articles created by Polbot